The 2020 Leinster Senior Football Championship Final was played at Croke Park in Dublin on 21 November 2020. It was contested by Dublin and Meath. Dublin won a tenth consecutive title.

Background
The game was held on a date originally intended for the second test of the 2020 International Rules Series. That event was cancelled in April 2020 amid the COVID-19 pandemic in the Republic of Ireland, which also led to the delayed championship. The GAA had proposed to hold a memorial ahead of the second test in commemoration of the 100th anniversary of the Bloody Sunday massacre, which saw fourteen civilians killed at a football match at Croke Park during the Irish War of Independence. This was instead held ahead of the 2020 Leinster Senior Football Championship Final.

As originally announced, the GAA intended the game to occur after a ceremonial "finishing of the match" featuring Dublin and Tipperary teams consisting of "available county or club players". However, Dublin were playing in this game and Tipperary qualified for the 2020 Munster Senior Football Championship Final which was held the following day, limiting player availability.

Match details

Post-match
Dublin captain Stephen Cluxton laid a wreath for the centenary.

Former Dublin player Ciarán Whelan said the result was "worrying" for the sport and that his former team "have their opponents psychologically smashed".

The result, combined with the COVID-19 pandemic, meant Dublin directly qualified for an All-Ireland semi-final against Cavan. Dublin won, easily, to qualify for the 2020 All-Ireland Senior Football Championship Final, the eighth time in ten years that Dublin reached the decider.

Notes

References

2L Final
Leinster Championship
Leinster Senior Football Championship Finals
Dublin county football team matches
Meath county football team matches